Charles-Christophe Malhiot (October 11, 1808 – November 9, 1874) was a doctor and a member of the Senate of Canada from 1867 until his death.

He was born in Verchères in Lower Canada, the son of François-Xavier Malhiot, the seigneur of Verchères. He studied medicine and settled at Yamachiche. In 1835, he married Julie-Éliza Montour, the daughter of Nicholas Montour, Seigneur of Pointe-du-Lac. He was mayor of Pointe-du-Lac from 1859 to 1864. In 1862, he was elected for a six-year term to the Legislative Council of the Province of Canada representing Shawinigan. After Confederation, he was appointed to the Senate as a member of the Liberal Party.

He died at Pointe-du-Lac in 1874.

References
 

1808 births
1874 deaths
Members of the Legislative Council of the Province of Canada
Canadian senators from Quebec
Liberal Party of Canada senators
Mayors of places in Quebec
People from Verchères, Quebec